Acroria is a genus of moths of the family Noctuidae erected by Francis Walker in 1858.

Species
 Acroria chloegrapha (Hampson, 1908)
 Acroria postalbida (Dyar, 1914)
 Acroria terens (Walker, 1857)
 Acroria viridirena (E. D. Jones, 1912)

References
 
 

Hadeninae
Noctuoidea genera